Jared Donaldson and Stefan Kozlov are the defending champions but only Kozlov defending his title partnering Taylor Fritz, losing in the first round to Toshihide Matsui and Dean O'Brien.

Jason Jung and Dennis Novikov won the title, defeating Alex Bolt and Frank Moser in the final 6–3, 4–6, [10–8].

Seeds

Draw

References
 Main Draw

Tennis Championships of Maui - Doubles